Await Further Instructions is a 2018 British science fiction horror film directed by Johnny Kevorkian. The film follows a dysfunctional family who winds up entrapped in their house on Christmas by a mysterious black membrane and begins receiving cryptic instructions from their television.

Plot 
The film centers upon a family who have gathered for Christmas. The family is made up of Nick, his girlfriend Annji, Nick's pregnant sister Kate, Kate's husband Scott, Grandad, and Nick's parents Tony and Beth. The gathering is initially fine but grows tense after Kate makes racist remarks to Annji. They quickly find that they are surrounded by a strange black substance and that they cannot flee the home. They receive messages warning them that their food is contaminated and instructing them to cleanse themselves with bleach, as well as take a vaccine dropped down their chimney. Tony forces the family to take the vaccines despite Annji's reservations, as the syringes look used. Grandad dies while vomiting black liquid.

The television later informs the family that one of their number is infected. Tony, Beth, Kate, and Scott believe it to be Annji, so they lock her in an upstairs bedroom with the dead body of Grandad. Nick unplugs the television, but is warned against this once it's plugged back in by Tony. Kate urges Scott to attack Nick, only for her to become injured in the process. A desperate Nick tries to secretly find a way to flee the home, only for the television to reveal this to the others.  Tony and Scott rush in, knock Nick unconscious, and drag him downstairs. The television then tells them that Nick is a sleeper agent and that they must get information from him. Tony and Scott torture Nick until Beth interrupts them to let them know that Kate has died.

The surviving family members are told to return to the first floor as the television is activating quarantine. Nick is able to get Annji downstairs, but is unable to save his mother, who dies after exposure to black smoke. Nick and Annji rush downstairs and find the TV displaying a bright light, and Nick unplugs the TV. The light stays on the TV, however, and the house begins shaking. The TV proclaims that it is being resurrected just before Nick passes out. Nick awakens to find that he and Annji have been restrained and that the television wants Scott and Tony to sacrifice them. Tony attempts to sacrifice Annji, but Nick and Scott attack him, and Tony murders Scott with an axe. A fight between Tony and Nick ends when Nick throws the TV onto Tony, killing him. The TV rights itself and wire-like tendrils snake out of the TV and enter Tony via the back of his head and take control of his body. They soon realize that the black substance is composed entirely of the living wires. Nick confronts the wires, and throws the axe into the "heart" inside the TV. The tendrils seemingly die, but soon begin moving and engulf them. Tony, being controlled by the wires, murders them with the axe. The tendrils digest Kate's body, leaving only her skeletal remains and her still-living baby amidst them. Tony brings in another TV, which greets the baby as "Ruby" and displays colorful patterns to get her attention. By this point, it turns out that television media itself has gained sapience and wants humanity to worship it as a god.

Cast 

Sam Gittins as Nick
Neerja Naik as Annji
Grant Masters as Tony
Abigail Cruttenden as Beth
Holly Weston as Kate
Kris Saddler as Scott
David Bradley as Grandad

Production 
Filming for Await Further Instructions took place in Yorkshire, England. Johnny Kevorkian adapted a script written by Gavin Williams; Kevorkian stated that he chose the movie as his second feature film outing as "it was so different to the usual stuff that comes across my desk." Williams began writing the script after listening to a track on the album Boxer by The National, "Apartment Story", stating that there was a lyric about "‘Stay indoors until somebody finds you. Do whatever the TV tells you’ and my little writer brain lit up with a spark."

Reception

Box office
Await Further Instructions made $3,618 worldwide. It made an additional $28,996 from home media sales.

Critical response
Await Further Instructions received a 81% on Rotten Tomatoes from 21 reviews. The film was labeled a NYT Critics Pick by the New York Times. It also received reviews from RogerEbert.com and The Guardian. Matt Donato reviewed it for Dread Central, stating that it "launches into survivalist psychotics that embrace walled-in escalation, always building towards “that" finale. The ride is filled with highs and lows, but damn if Johnny Kevorkian doesn't stick that landing."

See also
Terminator
I, Robot
Eagle Eye

References

2010s Christmas films
2010s Christmas horror films
2010s science fiction horror films
2018 horror films
British horror films
British monster movies